Red River Drifter is the thirty-third album by American singer-songwriter Michael Martin Murphey.

Recording
Red River Drifter was recorded in 2013 at Bumpin' Heads Studio and Omnisound Studio in Nashville, Tennessee, and Mole End Studio in Franklin, Tennessee.

Critical reception
In his review in Country Standard Time, Robert Wooldridge observed that "the western feel is still prominent, but Murphey also reveals bluegrass, country, pop and jazz influences on a collection of new compositions." Wooldridge continued:

Wooldridge concluded, "While recent efforts have been largely nostalgic with Murphey's devotion to western music, as well as revisiting some of his own classics such as 'Wildfire', 'Geronimo's Cadillac' and 'What Am I Doing Hangin' Round?', this contemporary collection nicely augments Murphey's impressive catalog."

Track listing
All songs were written by Michael Martin Murphey, Ryan Murphey, and Pat Flynn, except where noted.
 "Peaceful Country" – 2:42
 "Rolling Sky" – 3:27
 "Secret Smile" – 3:06
 "Faded Blue" – 3:45
 "Shake It Off" – 3:53
 "Hardscrabble Creek" – 4:12
 "Mountain Storm" (Michael Martin Murphey and Ryan Murphey) – 3:33
 "The Gathering" – 3:37
 "New Old Love" – 2:44
 "Unfinished Symphony" – 3:25

Credits
Music
 Michael Martin Murphey – vocals, acoustic guitar, banjo
 Ryan Murphey – acoustic guitar, mandolin, background vocals
 Pat Flynn – lead acoustic guitar, background vocals
 Jason Mowry – fiddle
 Troy Engle – fiddle, banjo
 Matt Pierson – bass
 Bobby Blazier – drums, percussion
 Pauline Resse – duet vocals , background vocals

Production
 Ryan Murphey – producer
 Pat Flynn – producer
 Michael Martin Murphey – executive producer, self-portrait
 Keith Compton – engineer
 Glenn Sweitzer – photography, album design

Chart performance

References

External links
 Michael Martin Murphey's Official Website

2013 albums
Bluegrass albums
Michael Martin Murphey albums
Western music (North America) albums